The Best of Friends is a 1982 Australian romantic comedy about two best friends who have an affair one night, resulting in the woman becoming pregnant.

Production
The script won $10,000 in a competition by the New South Wales Film Corporation for best original quality. Neville Wran presented the writer and director with the cheque.

Angela Punch McGregor later claimed that:
It was an excellent script. It was then mutilated by all of us. [Writer] Donald McDonald was very upset about it. The film was badly handled and I was miscast but I took it because I wanted the challenge of doing a comedy, which I hadn't done before. I thought my role was well written and wasn't cardboard... The director wasn't up to it, the film was miscast, the budget wasn't good.

References

External links

The Best of Friends at Oz Movies

1982 films
Australian romantic comedy films
1982 romantic comedy films
1980s English-language films
1980s Australian films